The 1884–85 Irish Cup was the fifth edition of the premier knock-out cup competition in Irish football. 

Distillery won the tournament for the second time and second year in a row, defeating Limavady 5–0 in the final.

Results

First round

|}

Replays

|}

Second round

|}

Replay

|}

Second Replay

|}

Third round

|}

Replay

|}

Fourth round

|}

Semi-finals

|}

Final

References

External links
 Northern Ireland Cup Finals. Rec.Sport.Soccer Statistics Foundation (RSSSF)

Irish Cup seasons
1884–85 domestic association football cups
1884–85 in Irish association football